Amphisbaena arenicola is a species of amphisbaenian in the family Amphisbaenidae. The species is endemic to Brazil.

References

arenicola
Reptiles described in 2019
Endemic fauna of Brazil
Reptiles of Brazil